Crossed is a comic book written by Garth Ennis and drawn by Jacen Burrows (for the first ten issues), published by Avatar Press. Following volumes Crossed: Family Values, Crossed 3D, and Crossed: Psychopath were written by David Lapham. A new series, Crossed: Badlands, was written and drawn by rotating creative teams. The franchise has also spawned two webcomics: Crossed: Wish You Were Here, which ran from 2012–2014, and Crossed: Dead or Alive, which began syndication in November 2014.

Publication history
Crossed is a creator-owned series from writer Garth Ennis and artist Jacen Burrows. It began with Crossed #0 on August 27, 2008, and all 10 issues have been released.

The second series, Crossed: Family Values, is written by David Lapham and drawn by Javier Barreno. Ennis described how this unusual situation for a creator-owned property came about:

Plot synopsis 

The story follows survivors dealing with a pandemic that causes its victims to carry out their most evil thoughts. Carriers of the virus are generally known as the "Crossed" due to a large, cross-like rash that appears on their faces – other names include "cross-faces" and "plus-faces". This contagion is primarily spread through bodily fluids, which the Crossed have used to great effect by treating their weapons with their fluids, as well as through other forms of direct fluidic contact such as rape and bites, assuming the victim lives long enough to turn. A major difference between the Crossed and other fictional zombie or insanity-virus epidemics (e.g., in the film 28 Days Later) is that while the Crossed are turned into homicidal violent psychopaths, they still retain a basic human-level of intelligence: thus, they are still capable of using tools and weapons, driving motor vehicles, setting complex traps, and other actions. It is occasionally noted in the series that a Crossed retains any skills they had prior to their infection; most simply lack the patience or sanity to do anything not immediately related to their vicious impulses.

The contagion spread across the entire world, with the Crossed killing, raping, engaging in cannibalism and maiming for fun, with governments and military overwhelmed; friends and family butchered each other with anything they laid their hands on, and cities were turned into vast charnel houses. Much of the Middle East was wiped out when Israel deployed nuclear weapons. The last organized act by the U.S. government was to shut down as many nuclear power plants as possible and then kill the nuclear scientists and technicians to prevent them from reactivating the plants.  A few nuclear power plants were not reached in time, however, such as Wolf Creek in Kansas and Browns Ferry in Alabama, detonated by Crossed who removed the control rods. One by one, the remaining military bases are overrun. Soon human civilization is all but gone, and mankind is an increasingly endangered species.

Plot elements

Depiction of the Crossed
The Crossed themselves show considerable variation, as they are still self-aware individuals –  albeit turned into homicidal maniacs. One of the most visible examples is the actual level of insanity demonstrated. Many Crossed are practically feral savages with absolutely no regard for their own self-preservation, to the point that they will gleefully mutilate themselves for the sheer thrill of it, including amputating their own limbs. Others will be so driven to kill that they will carry out suicide attacks, crashing vehicles or causing nuclear meltdowns. Most are capable of basic (albeit deranged) speech, and wield whatever clubs, knives, or sharp objects are at hand to attack anything around them. The more insane Crossed will even attack each other, though they apparently prefer the non-Crossed. Some characters speculate that this preference is due to their need for sadistic gratification: given that the Crossed are so insane that they will mutilate themselves voluntarily, it isn't as fun to torture fellow Crossed as it is to torture uninfected, frightened victims.

As stated by Garth Ennis:

In many cases, the personality and resultant madness of a Crossed individual will be affected by memories and relationships they had prior to infection. Examples of this include several Crossed in The Golden Road attacking Sanarkand specifically to exact vengeance on Gideon Welles, Eve carrying around the severed head of her boyfriend and sexually taunting Oliver (who betrayed her friends to the Crossed and raped her prior to her infection) in The Quisling, and Hazuki refusing to harm her friends after becoming Crossed in Five Bloody Fingers. It is also implied that certain mind-altering drugs can further influence a Crossed's personality; in Gore Angels, the Crossed known as "Al the Chemist" ate several hallucinogenic mushrooms prior to his infection, later exhibiting a fascination with "enlightenment" and apparently seeing uninfected humans as "purple people".

On rare occasions, pregnant women who have been infected and turned survive long enough to give birth, but their babies are born infected as well – apparently the placental barrier provides no protection against the infection (though it is possible that it does, but unsanitary birth conditions infect them during delivery itself, like neonatal conjunctivitis). Crossed women who have given birth are, however, gleefully willing to murder their own newborn babies.

The rate at which a person becomes infected ranges from several hours to a matter of minutes, and once infected there is no turning back. In most situations, the rate of infection is incredibly fast, in the range of one to three minutes.  No cure exists for the Crossed, and there is almost no hint that scientists were able to study the infection long enough to do any sort of thorough research on the dilemma. While cover art has shown infected lab monkeys, animals generally seem immune, with predators such as leopards and lions freely mauling and biting Crossed with no sign of infection.

Some survivors have attempted to slip past the Crossed by painting red cross-marks on their faces to simulate the rashes from the infection – the Crossed will attack other Crossed if they're bored or frustrated, but at least some of the time will leave other Crossed alone.  The effectiveness of the ruse varies between stories, but it rarely works for long.  In The Fatal Englishman, the main characters note that they have never seen this trick succeed in the five years they survived since the outbreak; on the other hand, the survivors seen at the beginning of The Quisling attribute their survival to the "fake cross" tactic, although they admit that they weren't sure if it would've fooled the Crossed for more than a passing glance (it should also be noted that they carried parts of the dismembered corpse whose blood they used for the fake crosses with them, which may or may not have "enhanced" the illusion to the Crossed).

"Evolution"

As time goes on in-universe, characters note that the Crossed have apparently been developing new habits. Some Crossed have been shown to be quite capable of complex pre-meditated actions. Not consumed by unthinking bloodlust to the extent that many of the other infected are, they have enough intellectual wherewithal to plan ambushes and traps, and organize gangs of Crossed to assault survivor enclaves. The more mindless rage-consumed Crossed will still know how to use firearms if they find them, but usually won't think rationally enough to plan out where to acquire more firearms. The more rational and calculating Crossed, in contrast, will actively seek out armories to acquire new firearms. Some of these more rational Crossed will consciously coat their weapons in their own bodily fluids, actively trying to turn non-infected survivors into more Crossed.

The series frequently presents Crossed specimens with unusual levels of focus and restraint, allowing them to form gangs of Crossed around them. Major examples of such characters include Horsecock in the original series, Ashley and Ashlynne in Homo Superior, Smokey in The Quisling, the nun Aoileann in Wish You Were Here, and serial killer Beau Salt, whose journal and descendants survive to Crossed +100. In comics by Simon Spurrier, this is attributed to some quality in the infected or their circumstances before infection; it's suggested in one issue that the disease doesn't always take proper hold in a "broken brain". Shaky says that Aoileann is good at "holding back passion" (which is mistaken for control) and simply passed this on to her group. Russian gangster Mattias had periods of control (followed by violent mania) due to brain damage from long-term ketamine use, and an Australian was focused on getting revenge.  In Wish You Were Here, it is vaguely implied that Aoileann's unusual reaction to the Crossed infection may also be due to her having epilepsy, altering how it affected her brain. Beau Salt, already a prolific serial killer before 'The Surprise', as he called it, was largely unaffected by the infection, retaining all his faculties. He spent decades weeding out feral Crossed in order to build a functioning society of Crossed, passing his legacy down to his children, named after The Seven Dwarves.

Aoileann is capable of having lucid conversations with other people, making complex future plans and traps, and even seems to have retained certain empathetic emotions, as she is actually horrified at the prospect of personally killing other people (though she lets her followers kill uninfected people) and attempts to hold back her followers from killing Shaky (other humans are fair game). Mattias displays not only cognitive thinking but also strong emotional feelings. In his human life he fell in love with his parole officer, Serena; following his infection, he is determined to find and protect her, only to go insane with grief when he finds he came too late. This showed traces of positive emotions such as love and sadness that is almost never observed in other Crossed. If and how his ketamine habit affects this is unknown. Smokey is one of the smartest Crossed ever seen, being able to organize and lead a large group of Crossed. He is even able to strike deals with survivors, protecting them from the other Crossed in exchange for their assistance in luring out other survivors. An exact reason why he is so much smarter is never given; although there were medical reasons behind Aoileann and Mattias, no such conditions are ever stated with him. He does not display emotions, he is just more intelligent.  The twin sisters Ashley and Ashlynne in the Florida Keys are also intelligent, for unknown reasons, though the fact that they are identical twins may indicate that it is due to some random genetic mutation.  In issue #97, a navy patrol ship captain with access to a long-range communications system (communicating with other survivors across continents) told Smokey that such intelligent "super-Crossed" were exceedingly rare, being more of a scary campfire story that survivors shared with each other.  The captain mentioned that besides Smokey, he had heard rumors of a nun in England (Aoileann), twin sisters in Florida (Ashley and Ashlynne), and an autistic kid in Montreal (similar to epilepsy, apparently his Autism made his brain structure different enough that the virus didn't take full hold).

Of all these "super-Crossed", there is one who takes it to another level: Salt, an infamous serial killer (known as the "Phonebook Killer") who was infected on C-Day. Because Salt was already homicidally insane and had no restrictions on his impulses, the Crossed virus did not significantly change him (perhaps because his psychopathic brain structure was already significantly altered from normal). Retaining all of his intellect and long-term planning ability, Salt soon became a dark messiah of sorts to the Crossed. He created the hundred-year plan to ensure the Crossed survive and continue the apocalyptic cycle indefinitely.

The "super-Crossed" tend to appear in comics that take place long after the outbreak first occurred, up to five years later by The Fatal Englishman. As Shaky explained in Wish You Were Here, it is not so much that the Crossed "evolved" during these years, but rather the process of natural selection setting in. Logically, many of the Crossed who were so insane that they didn't care about their own self-preservation have died off, while the far more dangerous rational and calculating ones took steps to survive over a long period of time.  Those Crossed with little sense of preservation, not even the sense to put on warm clothing in colder weather, tended to die off in the winters. The Crossed who survived that long tend to be the more rational and lucid ones who have the wherewithal to preserve themselves, use combat tactics like avoiding gunfire, use guns themselves, and setting complex ambushes.  Meanwhile, the few surviving non-infected are hardened veterans who have been combating the Crossed for years, further increasing the pressure of natural selection as the Crossed are forced to become smarter and more cunning to catch the survivors off-guard.

Most of the completely "anti-social" Crossed die out in the heavy fighting of the initial outbreak.  By the time of Crossed: Family Values, survivors observe that most Crossed usually form up into gangs of about five to fifteen members – any larger than that and they start fighting each other again, bringing the number back down to below about fifteen.  The more coherent Crossed who survived many years, however, are capable of forming into even larger groups of over a hundred without fighting each other (as seen in The Fatal Englishman and the webcomics).  As seen in Family Values and the webcomics, when there are no more uninfected around to attack, after a while a group of Crossed will usually fall into a sort of bored stupor, aimlessly wandering in one direction until they find more people to attack. A number of Crossed, however, appear to be naturally smarter or, at least, more capable of patience and planning: deferring immediate pleasure to have a greater atrocity later. These tend to become the leaders of large gangs, numbering in the many dozens or, in Crossed +100, a whole community. These appear more often in stories set months or years after the outbreak.

Outbreak
Before The Thin Red Line, the Crossed stories agreed that the infection was stunningly rapid, so fast that the news media and most world governments had little, if any, time to respond, but the exact specifics of the outbreak differed from writer to writer. Depending on the story, it took anywhere from a week to a mere matter of hours for the infection to spread across the globe. In the original story, the infection erupts suddenly across the entire United States without warning and later spreads; a survivor says Canada tried to fortify the border "in the first week," and were unaware the virus had reached them until after that point. In contrast, Badlands #14–18, #40–43, and Wish You Were Here have the infection erupting across the entire planet in the same day, the latter two showing United Kingdom and Japan being rapidly overrun; Badlands #16 has the White House (and Surgeon General) and part of the news media still around the next day, reporting on the crisis. Badlands #10–13 ignores this, and has the Crossed tearing through small towns without being noticed, getting more and more numerous over the course of a week; and Badlands #26, also by Ennis, has a British soldier named Harry (later appearing in The Thin Red Line) say he's been aware of the Crossed for "the past three days" by the time the outbreak is public.

In the Crossed: Dead or Alive webcomic, the characters discuss a collapsed bridge, and speculate it was detonated by the U.S. Army in "the first few days," in an effort to cut major road arteries and slow traffic between the eastern and western sections of the United States to slow the spread of the virus.  In the stories where the infection is sudden, the Crossed are shown overrunning the United States at sunset/night and London in the afternoon.  Badlands arc 62–70 shows the initial outbreak in the city of San Diego and the attempts by the US military to restore order in the city, and, as the epidemic got out of hand, evacuate thousands of surviving civilians from the city to waiting cruise ships and extract them to a supposedly secure island off the California coastline. However, a U.S. Navy fleet sent from Pearl Harbor to protect the evacuation ships at San Diego harbor somehow falls victim to the infection and ultimately massacres much of the civilian evacuation vessels still residing in San Diego, killing and maiming hundreds or possibly thousands of survivors.

Homo Tortor by Kieron Gillen introduced a fringe scientific theory that a viral pandemic of sociopathy had caused the mass extinction of prehistoric hominids. When the outbreak happened, one man attempted to find the theory's professor in the hope of learning about the origins of the Crossed – there turned out to be no link, with the prehistoric scenes being an in-universe story by the Crossed about the world they were making now.

The Thin Red Line (Badlands #50–56) finally established an origin and timeline of the infection as happening in the summer of 2008, the time of the first comic. Other stories have gone with this, and Crossed +100 gives a specific date of July 27, 2008, for when Americans see the "Surprise" as starting.(This origin clashes with other outbreak stories: London is not overrun for several days, the White House is overrun before most of the U.S., and the Crossed are public before an outbreak in Japan or most of the United States).

The outbreak began in Yorkshire, United Kingdom: the patient zero was a man who had a psychotic breakdown and murdered his family, and the infection spread rapidly from two local policemen to the entire population of the village of Tethersby. Within a few days, there were reports of infections in France, Chad, Australia, South Africa, Pakistan, Russia, and the United States. During the story, government scientist Dr. Chopra points out that the British "patient zero" cannot logically be the patient zero if the infection is appearing so far abroad, and theorizes if the virus is "something in the D.N.A....the planet's" that has manifested, and this is why it doesn't follow any known scientific laws. "Patient Zero" himself was aware of events he could not possibly have seen or heard, and saw visions of atrocities he was unaware of, suggesting a paranormal angle, and refers to it as something that "cleanses."

In the U.K., indecisiveness by Prime Minister Gordon Brown meant that a state of emergency wasn't declared until after a Sky News team found and filmed the villagers committing a mass suicide. From this point the infection spread rapidly, and the Prime Minister and his staff were moved into a secure bunker guarded by the SAS and SO1 police officers, which also doubled as a medical research centre where "Patient Zero" was placed under quarantine. Soon after, the Crossed had overrun most of Yorkshire and other parts of northern England and Scotland, with smaller outbreaks appearing further south. Under the belated state of emergency, the U.K. suspended all public transport, airlifted troops back from Afghanistan, and blockaded the M1 motorway just north of Northampton; south of there, cordons held and prevented large-scale refugee migration, which could bring more of the infected south.

As the infection appeared worldwide, a group of Pakistani Crossed dropped a nuclear bomb on Delhi, wiping out most – if not all of – India's government; India's remaining military at least had the wherewithal not to launch a nuclear counterstrike against Pakistan, realizing it would achieve nothing.  Shortly thereafter, Russian Prime Minister (and Acting President following Dmitri Medvedev's incapacitation) Vladimir Putin requested the RAF shoot down 40 Crossed-piloted Tu-95 bombers before NORAD – unable to launch planes due to similar problems – feel obliged to launch nukes. When Gordon Brown contacts the White House, the person answering (implied to be President George W. Bush) is clearly infected, confirming Washington D.C. has been overrun. A single Tornado GR1 is launched to intercept the Russians, and the crew sacrifice themselves to prevent nuclear war from breaking out.

After this, the government is evacuated to bunkers, civil authority is superseded by the Armed Forces, and orders go out to shut down all nuclear facilities. However, Prime Minister Brown says in the long term they should "hopefully" regain control, and that government scientist Dr. Chopra has a chance of finding an answer to the virus. Unfortunately, Brown's advisor – acting without clearing it with the PM – had ordered two of the SAS to torture "patient zero" for information, which led to their infection and "zero" turning fully-Crossed. As the bunker is being sealed, it's revealed Chopra is infected, and about to butcher the Prime Minister.

In the United States, the President declared a national state of emergency with the full backing of Congress, whilst forty-two state governors imposed martial law in their home states. FEMA and the National Disaster Medical System were activated, but were late in mobilizing. Within days of the outbreak, the power grid had failed in Atlanta, St. Louis, Columbus, and Chicago, and likely most other cities, as well. NDMS deployed mobile mortuary teams across the eastern seaboard in an attempt to contain the epidemic, and private health-care centres were federalised.

One hundred years after the initial outbreak, as depicted in Crossed: +100, it is revealed that around 2050 A.D., Crossed numbers began to drop significantly, and eventually regular humans once again outnumber the infected, though small family-groups of Crossed continued to inhabit some areas, breeding new generations by refraining from killing their young. Crossed +100 shows that in the long run, Crossed will even learn to breed and form dysfunctional family-units. Human society has somewhat begun to rebuild in the former United States, but is still socially and technologically backwards compared to society before "The Surprise," as C-Day is referred to in 2108.

Series

Crossed (Volume One)
The first story (Volume One in trade) takes place ten months after the outbreak, with flashbacks to those events, as a small group make their way toward Alaska in the belief that its low population before the outbreak will mean there are fewer Crossed to be avoided, and that the Crossed's gleeful bloodlust hampers their ability to look after themselves. However, they encounter a small group of Crossed who have a degree of self-control and subsequently begin a hunt for the survivors.

Crossed: Family Values (Volume 2)
In Family Values, the story centers on a religious family who escapes their North Carolinian ranch to survive in a mountain compound led by the protagonist Adaline's father, who, while being a strong leader against the Crossed, is a sexual predator who has routinely raped his daughters.

Crossed: 3D

3D was written with the 3D effect in mind and is not available in a 2D format.  The story follows SWAT veteran Lt. Hunt MacAvoy as he leads a rescue mission into the middle of Crossed-infested New York City to rescue a stranded doctor.  At 48 pages, the 3D one-shot is about a quarter of the size of one of the collected "Volumes".

Crossed: Psychopath (Volume 3)

In Psychopath, the story follows a group of survivors who pick up an injured man, Harold Lorre, who understands the way the Crossed think and is tracking a specific group of Crossed. Lorre is the titular psychopath, and he is killing members of his group of humans as he deems them problematic, passing the deaths off as the grisly acts of Crossed. The Crossed group they are tracking killed a woman Lorre had stalked, prior to the outbreak, and subsequently forced a relationship upon her as they survived. After she was turned into a Crossed and killed, Lorre kept a fragment of her breast in a plastic bag.

The first Crossed Annual spins off from Wish You Were Here, featuring the lifestyle of the psychotic SBS marine Jackson. He appears to be tracking down the scientist who created the Crossed virus, an earlier version of which drove Jackson mad; this is simply a delusion of his, as he'd always been psychotic and the 'weapon' does not exist.

Crossed: Badlands (Volumes 4–17)

Badlands features shorter story arcs of varying length, by different authors.

Issues #1–3 (Of the World and Its Becoming, by Ennis and Burrows) follow a group of United Kingdom survivors traveling across Scotland. As they struggle to stay ahead of a horde of Crossed – hoping that the harsh conditions of the Scottish mountains will wear down the self-destructive Crossed – the leader of the group, Ian, relates his introspection on the purpose of survival when there is no hope. By the end of the third issue, the entire group is killed and/or turned.

In issues #4-#9 (Homo Superior, by Jamie Delano and Leandro Rizzo), the story follows individual survivors in the Everglades – Steve, a former military woman who has become cruel and sadistic after countless traumas in her past; Greg, a jaded family man who lives off the grid to get away from his dreary home life; Leon, a teenage "swamp rat" living at a fortified "base" with his domineering extended family; and the twins Ashley and Ashlynn, who fled the city after the Crossed outbreak began. The survivors eventually meet and band together, only for their individual psychoses to ultimately cause them all to become Crossed, with Steve infecting herself willingly after realizing that she was barely different from the infected in the first place.

In issues #10–13 (Yellow Belly, by David Lapham and Burrows), a teenage survivor named Edmund (nicknamed Yellow Belly for his cowardice) relates his experience of being at a carnival where the clowns and other workers become infected in the early hours of the outbreak, turning fun times into depraved terror. In issue #13, he crosses paths with Harold Lorre, the main character of Crossed: Psychopath, who encourages Yellowbelly to use the Crossed-infested world as an opportunity to obtain power by force. Ultimately though, he is killed by a biker woman he fled with, when he confided his cowardice that resulted in the death of her sister-in-arms.
 
Issues #14–18 (The Golden Road, written by David Hine), are set just prior to the outbreak, in the town of Stableford, Wisconsin. The town gained the colloquial nickname of "Stumptown" after its residents participated in a mass insurance fraud by "losing" limbs to collect payouts, only to have their scheme exposed by infamous transgressive writer Gideon Welles, who used the town as inspiration. To add insult to injury, Welles built his massive estate, Samarkand, on the outskirts of the area. The story centers around aspiring writer Clooney and his girlfriend Tabitha, who Welles has invited to Samarkand for a writer's retreat. Unfortunately, Welles is a sadist who psychologically breaks down his guests; worse yet, a horde of Crossed has arrived in town by train. Emasculated and humiliated by Welles' debauched sex orgy with his girlfriend and other guests, Clooney uses the Crossed to turn on his fellow writers, leading to all of them being killed or turned by the horde. The only survivor is Philly, the young niece of town cop Lorna; she escapes by boat after being forced to kill her aunt, who was infected when a dead Crossed fell on her.

Issues #19–20 (Conquers All, by Si Spurrier (Crossed: Wish You Were Here) and Raulo Caceres (Crossed: Psychopath)) involve Mattias, a former criminal who was turned into one of the Crossed, but still retains a level of self-control and rationality compared to the other Crossed. A paroled enforcer for a local mobster, Mattias fell in love with his parole officer, Serena, and they had a relationship that ended due to the conflict between their duties and their love. In the present, Mattias travels to the police station to find Serena, only to find she had taken her own life days earlier. After a ketamine-enhanced rampage, he passes out in a parking lot, reawakening with no memory of his search for Serena and repeating his futile journey.

Issues #21–24 (The Livers, by David Lapham and Miguel Garrido) rejoin Amanda, the survivor of David Lapham's Psychopath arc. Having been scarred by her experience with Lorre, she no longer trusts anyone, and uses whatever means at her disposal to survive, while paranoia ultimately causes her to kill anyone who takes her in before they can get her. She falls in with The Livers, three survivors that have formed a close bond despite their mutual insanity and occasional cannibalistic tendencies, and finds a new way to survive.

Issues #25–28 (The Fatal Englishman, by Ennis and Caceres) are set five years after C-Day. Four British Army soldiers (representing each nation of the United Kingdom) go on a suicide mission to break into Porton Down and release the biological weapons, hoping it will wipe out the Crossed but leave enough humans alive for Britain to rebuild and go on an offensive war against the infected. Along the way, they become guardians of a group of children and a Catholic priest, with whom the title character shares his wisdom. Eventually, after ensuring the survival of the priest and his flock, they decide against their genocidal plan, instead blowing up the entrance of Porton Down to stop anyone from using its lethal cargo before setting off to make a final stand against the Crossed. However, the leader of the group realizes that he cannot see his friends suffer a grisly end at the hands of the Crossed; thus, he shoots them dead on the way up before confronting a horde of Crossed with nothing but a half-filled pistol.

Issues #29–32 (Quisling, written by Christos Gage) follow Oliver, an anthropologist and self-proclaimed "survivor" who studies the Crossed while doing whatever it takes to prolong his life. While hiding out with a group of survivors, he observes an imposing axe-wielding member of the Crossed, dubbed "Smokey" for his fireman's garb, noting that he seems to have much greater intelligence that allows him to lead his fellow infected (paralleling the character Big Daddy from Land of the Dead). After being cornered by Smokey's band, Oliver betrays his fellow survivors and strikes a deal with the Crossed, helping them hunt other survivors while hoping for a chance to escape or to find a group capable enough to fight back. As his guilt grows and rumors of other "Super-Crossed" reach him (featuring a cameo of the twins from the Homo Superior arc), Oliver realizes that Smokey is far too dangerous to leave alive; especially when the Crossed reads his journal and assaults a nuclear base for its weapons. Ultimately, Oliver gives his life to stop Smokey's plans, willingly infecting himself to prevent his "partner" from using him any longer. Enraged, Smokey slaughters his band of Crossed before storming out of the base, setting out for Florida in search of more "Super-Crossed" like him.

Issues #33–36 (Breakdown, by Lapham and Miguel Ruiz) pick up with Amanda as she is hunting for the Livers and is forced to hide from a religiously-themed tribe of Crossed pursuing the same prey.  She hides in a crawlspace for days, but is devastated when the Crossed bring in her two Liver companions – one captive, and the other infected – and she loses the strength of the delusions they supported. She attempts to re-integrate with another group of survivors, but her growing insanity (represented by hallucinations of Harold Lorre from Psychopath) drives her to kill them all before returning to the crawlspace, determined to remain until she either dies or overcomes her madness.

Issues #37–39 (American Quitters, by Spurrier and Rafael Ortiz) follow the odd couple of a stoned out hippy and a hardcore biker traveling cross-country to San Diego to die by the ultimate overdose and while exacting revenge on a rival biker gang leader, respectively. Along the way, they pick up a pregnant Mexican woman fleeing from the drug lord father, trying to reach an island sanctuary off the Baja California peninsula. Ultimately, 'no lesson is learned' as all three of them die in unexpected ways; the biker is overrun by Crossed while overdosing on the ultimate high, the hippy is killed fulfilling the biker's revenge, and the pregnant woman is torn apart by her infected relatives on the island.

Issues #40–43 (Gore Angels, by David Hine) look into the broken mind of an abused girl during the early days of the Crossed epidemic in rural Japan. After being drugged, gang-raped, and humiliated on the Internet while in America, Emiko channels her anger and shame into Gore Angels, an incredibly violent manga sold under a pseudonym with the help of her friend Satoshi. By chance, one of her few friends from America has come to Japan with the instigator of the incident (and the latter's girlfriend) in hopes of finding a resolution to Emiko's pain, but everything goes off the rails when the Crossed begin to emerge...

Issues #44–49 (Grave New World, by Daniel Way and Emiliano Urdinola) follow a group of US Coast Guard personnel who hope to outlast the Crossed by setting out on a boat and finding an island to call home. However, taking on a pair of survivors leads to a whole new array of problems, not the least of which include a horde of Crossed pirates and the increasingly erratic behavior of their own Captain.

Issues #50–56 (The Thin Red Line, by Ennis and Christian Zanier) reintroduce the four men from The Fatal Englishman, revealing them to have once been security for British Prime Minister Gordon Brown. The story shows the very beginning of the Crossed outbreak, focusing on Britain's efforts to contain the madness and discover its source; however, they soon realize that the situation is far worse than they could have ever realized.

Issues #57–61 (by Justin Jordan and Georges Duarte) follow Esperanza and Jane, a pair of young women fleeing from Alejandro, Esperanza's Crossed brother, and the horde of infectees at his command. They eventually find safe haven at a woodland camp commanded by Sutter, a hardened survivalist with plans of his own that have little to do with the survival of his campmates...

Issues #62–70 (by Lapham and Francisco Manna) concern Gavin Edward Land, a former police detective seeking vengeance against the people who raped and murdered his daughter. As he works through his list and the Crossed outbreak in San Diego, U.S., he learns more than he wanted to know after Wentz, his final target, seems to have turned a new leaf in the wake of the apocalypse.

Issues #71–74 (Five Bloody Fingers, written by David Hine) focus on Uboshita Satoshi, the friend of Emiko briefly seen in Gore Angels. When C-Day breaks out in Japan, Satoshi sets out to find his blood brothers, the Five Bloody Fingers, and help them survive C-Day.  Finding Hazuki, the girl he loves (and one of his blood brothers) turns to be a harder task than he thought, as her father is a yakuza boss who is also on the lookout for her. The friends find themselves making a stand against the Crossed at a Japanese cosplay convention, where their blood oath may be tested with the relentless threat of the Crossed...assuming that Boss Yamada doesn't first feed them to Usama, his pet lion, in the end all 5 infect each other renewing their blood oath, becoming infected, and die fighting other Crossed.

Issues #75–80 (Homo Tortor, written by Kieron Gillen) show two simultaneous narratives.
 The main story concerns the attempts of a survivor group, led by college student Washington, to find a possible cure to the Crossed from the notes of Professor Nelson, a man who believed that a race of early humans similar to the Crossed nearly wiped out humanity 75,000 years ago (See the Toba catastrophe theory). Hounded by the Crossed at every turn, Washington's group eventually discover Professor Nelson's bunker, containing information about the early humans, which he has dubbed Homo tortor ("man who tortures").
 The second narrative goes 75,000 years in the past, where a group of early humans, led by the young hunter Lion, are captured by the "Blood Men" (Homo tortor) after their village is wiped out; they are subsequently brought to the Blood Men's "city of cities" to fight in an arena against men and giant beasts that the Blood Men had collected. When the "festivities" are cut short by a Crossed outbreak, Lion and his group must attempt to survive the ensuing carnage.
Ultimately, Washington discovers that everything about Homo tortor was made up by Professor Nelson, who has become Crossed during the outbreak. Along with his similarly-infected assistant (and Washington's college girlfriend) Amy, he wrote the story not as an attempt to falsify history, but as a vision of the society he intends to create with his band of Crossed.

Issues #81–86 (The Lesser of Two Evils, by Mike Wolfor) begins shortly after C-Day, with a group of survivors stranded on a partially-collapsed overpass. Although they are safe from the lingering Crossed, things begin to unravel after they are joined by Morgan and Olivia, a pair of women who claim to have survived the Crossed due to their "bible": "Surviving D-Day" a best-selling "zombie survival guide" novel (similar to The Zombie Survival Guide).

Issues #87–90 (Shrink, by Max Bemis and Fernando Melek) follow two brothers; the straight-laced psychologist Jack and the hedonistic bully Clancy. As Jack and Tiffany (a close friend of his) prepare themselves for the day the Crossed outbreak finally hits their suburban neighborhood, Clancy crashes by and asks Jack for a favor; after willingly infecting himself with the Crossed plague, he has his brother lock him in the basement and attempt to psychoanalyze his Crossed self, hoping that Jack can learn something of importance about the outbreak and its source.

Issues #91–92 (Anti-Crossed, by Bemis and German Erramouspe) follow a group of 5 survivors – 4 men and a female author named Leigha – surviving in a barricaded comic book store as they struggle with their depleting morale and growing boredom. It is soon revealed that the male survivors – all massive comic book fans – had taken Leigha hostage early in the outbreak, and have since been periodically raping her at gun point. Due to their growing boredom, the guys make a deal with Leigha; if she writes them an "Anti-Crossed" comic, they will refrain from maltreating her and give her other "privileges". Leigha reluctantly agrees, making a comic that fulfills all of her captor's twisted fantasies, but things may change when two strangers arrive at the store.

Issues #93–99 (by Gage and Fernando Heinz) begins by following a band of survivors led by Cody, an opportunistic man who designed disaster shelters for the elite before stealing one for himself when C-Day hit. His state-of-the-art bunker serves the group well until it comes afoul of Smokey, the "Super-Crossed" last seen in the Quisling arc. After being driven out and left at Smokey's mercy, Cody saves himself by offering to help Smokey mold the Crossed into a coherent society, advising him on means of controlling the others' bloodlust and promising them fresh victims by breeding uninfected like cattle. When this inevitably fails (in part due to a remorseful Cody sacrificing himself to undo his own work), Smokey seeks out other Super-Crossed like himself, eventually finding the Crossed twins from the Homo Superior arc.

Issue #100 (also by Gage and Fernando Heinz) follows Smokey and the twins as they attempt to fulfill the former's dream of ending the self-destructive nature of the Crossed. Although they manage to establish a reasonably-functional homestead with dozens of followers, Smokey remains depressed and laments to an old Cody that it is a far cry from the new society he had hoped to create. The children he fathered with the twins also seem to be no more intelligent than regular Crossed, leading Smokey to believe that their species is doomed to die out within a generation.  Years later, the aging Smokey kills Cody by quickly breaking his neck, sparing him from a slow and painful death. Shortly after, Smokey is betrayed and left for dead by the twins and his own son, now revealed to have been a "Super-Crossed" the entire time; the twins explain that they prefer immediate self-indulgence over long-term planning. Smokey survives the attempted assassination by jumping into a river, emerging later and limping off to fight another day with a smile on his face.

The final issue, foreshadows the resurgence of human society a century later in Crossed: +100, with Smokey's homestead receiving news of human colonies beginning to re-establish themselves as the feral Crossed die out.

Crossed: Wish You Were Here

In the webcomic Crossed: Wish You Were Here (written by Si Spurrier and drawn by Javier Barreno (Vol.1) and Fernando Melek (Vol.2)), former writer "Shaky" (short for Shakespeare) writes in his journal of life on the island of Cava off of the coast of Scotland, where he and a handful of other survivors try to have some semblance of society while desperately trying to keep the wandering Crossed at bay.

In the first volume, Shakespeare must deal with the logistics of living on an Cava with his group, under two men Rab and Don with very different leadership styles.

Crossed: Dead or Alive
The first series was originally optioned for an independently funded film, with Ennis writing the screenplay. It was going to be financed by Trigger Street Productions and produced by Michael De Luca, Jason Netter, and Kevin Spacey. In the end of 2012, however, Ennis announced that he and Avatar Press had recovered the rights to the franchise. They made plans to launch a series of webisodes in an attempt to generate interest for a feature film. In March 2013 Crossed: Dead Or Alive, an upcoming series of live action webisodes written and directed by Ennis, was announced. DOA will be accompanied by an Ennis-penned tie-in webcomic that will expand and further develop the concepts of the film series and its characters.  A goal was set to film all the episodes for Crossed: Dead or Alive season 1 in early 2014.

The webcomic was launched on November 13, 2014, with the plans to start production on the live-action series as soon as the fundraising campaign began to make money.

Crossed +100
A series called Crossed +100, written by Alan Moore and with art by Gabriel Andrade for the first six issues, debuted in December 2014.  It follows a group of humans 100 years after the outbreak.  After running across a group of Crossed, they find that the infected have begun to multiply again after having almost disappeared.

One hundred years on from the initial outbreak, it is revealed that around 2050 AD, Crossed numbers began to drop significantly and eventually regular humans once again outnumbered the infected, though small family groups of Crossed continued to inhabit some areas, breeding new generations by refraining from killing their young.  Again, this was simply the result of natural selection:  Crossed populations which attacked their own children died out from old age eventually, while only those which didn't would still survive a hundred years later.  The Crossed started diminishing in numbers by 2050 because by forty years later, any adults infected in the initial outbreak (i.e. 20 or older) were starting to get too old to survive such a violent lifestyle (against both Crossed, the uninfected, and the elements).  Teenagers and children infected in the initial outbreak were not strong enough to compete against adult Crossed at the time, so they didn't tend to survive forty years of constant fighting.

The Crossed infection is stated to have spread around the planet on July 27, 2008, an event commonly called "the Surprise".  By 2108, human society has somewhat begun to rebuild in the former United States, but is still socially and technically backwards compared to society before the Surprise.  The society of the human survivors has drastically changed after a hundred years, with slang derived from a post-Crossed world.  In the Tennessee region shown in Crossed: +100, major religions such as Judaism and Christianity have died out, and most people are irreligious, though there are a few survivor enclaves that still practice Islam (the comic creators stated that one of the reasons the story was set in Tennessee is due to the large Muslim population in present-day Murfreesboro; other large Muslim populations in the United States are concentrated in major metropolitan areas, which thus stood lower chance of surviving the Crossed epidemic). Few survivors living in 2108 have even seen a Crossed person, to the point that many younger people mockingly imitate the Crossed with face paint, and chasing each other pretending to be Crossed is a childhood game.

In 2108, a group of survivors from the rebuilt settlement at Chattanooga, Tennessee (called "Chooga"), make a horrifying discovery through the diary entries of Beauregard Salt, an infamous serial killer (known as the "Phonebook Killer") who was infected on C-Day.  Because Salt was already homicidally insane and had no restrictions on his impulses, the Crossed virus did not significantly change him (perhaps because his psychopathic brain structure was already significantly altered from normal). Salt considered the new world of the Crossed to be a paradise, but he also had the foresight to realize that it would be difficult to sustain indefinitely – given that many Crossed will rape and eat their own small children.  Salt therefore began self-consciously conducting conditioning experiments on other Crossed, to weed out the uncontrollable ones and actively select for the ones that could display enough restraint to follow long-term plans.  Salt also came to realize that because the Crossed were constantly fighting the uninfected, the survivors were becoming battle-hardened and difficult for the Crossed to fight; therefore, he prepared a plan which would take decades to reach fruition (an explicit reference to the Seldon Plan in Isaac Asimov's Foundation Series), in which the Crossed would basically let the uninfected survivor enclaves "lie fallow" for a full generation at a time; over time, the uninfected would get soft, unused to a daily fight for survival against the Crossed. Salt even planned out that the return attacks of the Crossed against survivor enclaves would take place on the day of the 100th anniversary of the Surprise, in July 2108. Chaos unfolds as the uninfected humans seek to protect the remaining settlements in the east coast area of the US, while trying to uncover the conspiracy laid out by Salt a hundred years earlier.

Crossed +100: Mimic

A six-issue series (April 2018–October 2018) with story by Christos Gage and art by Emiliano Urdinola, set in the world of Moore's +100. It follows Julie (an uninfected archivist) and Fleshcook (a Crossed raised by one of the twelve disciples of Beauregard Salt) as they attempt to forge an alliance between infected and uninfected. The main story is backed by Crossed +100: American History X, a series of stand-alone stories written by Pat Shand and with art by Raulo Caceres, set at various points in the decades between Crossed and Crossed +100.

Collected editions

Legacy 
The Sadness (Chinese: 哭悲; pinyin: Kū bēi), a 2021 Taiwanese body horror film that was heavily inspired by the Crossed comic book series.

Notes

External links

Twitter
Facebook
 
 

Crossed #0 Review , #1  and #4 , Comics Bulletin
 Crossed from Viewcomic

Comics by Garth Ennis
Comics by Alan Moore
Viral outbreaks in comics
Comics controversies
Cannibalism in fiction
Dystopian comics
Comics set in the 22nd century